Millsap Independent School District is a public school district based in Millsap, Texas (USA).

Millsap ISD covers a  area in west central Parker County, approximately nine miles east of Mineral Wells and fifteen miles (24 km) west of Weatherford. A very small portion of the district extends into Palo Pinto County. In addition to Millsap, the district also serves the city of Cool.

In 2009, the school district was rated "academically acceptable" by the Texas Education Agency.

Schools
Millsap High School (Grades 9-12)
Millsap Middle School (Grades 6-8)
Millsap Elementary School (Grades PK-5)

See also
List of school districts in Texas

References

External links
Millsap ISD – Official site.

School districts in Parker County, Texas
School districts in Palo Pinto County, Texas